Jon Conrad is an American politician and a Republican member of the Wyoming House of Representatives representing the 19th district since January 10, 2023.

Political career
When incumbent Republican representative Danny Eyre announced his retirement, Conrad declared his candidacy and won the Republican primary on August 16, 2022 with 44% of the vote, defeating future acting Wyoming Secretary of State Karl Allred and candidate Andy Stocks. He then won the general election on November 8, 2022, defeating Democratic nominee Sarah Butters and write-in Republican candidate Joe Webb, who was endorsed by the Uinta County Republican Party with 57% of the vote.

References

External links
Profile from Ballotpedia

Living people
Republican Party members of the Wyoming House of Representatives
Weber State University alumni
University of Phoenix alumni
21st-century American politicians
Year of birth missing (living people)